The Sichuan University of Science and Engineering (SUSE) is a provincial public university in Zigong, Sichuan, China. The university was originally established in 1965, which incorporated three other colleges to become a comprehensive university in 2003. The university is now sponsored by the Sichuan Provincial People's Government.  

SUSE is one of the key universities supported by “Foundation Ability Construction Project for China’s Middle West Universities” and the “Model Scientific Research Institution of Provincial High and New Technology Industry” affirmed by the People’s Government of Sichuan Province.

Academics

SUSE consists of 17 schools. It has 4 primary disciplines which offer master degrees, 30 grade-2 disciplines which offer master degrees, 2 professional master’s programs (5 subjects for master of engineering) and 74 undergraduate programs. SUSE has a comprehensive range of disciplines covering 9 categories, namely, engineering, science, management, economy, law, literature, art, education and history.

SUSE has about 1500 full-time teachers, 700 professors and associate professors, and about 1000 teachers with master or doctor degrees. There are 1 national outstanding teacher, 8 “Experts Receiving Special Governmental Allowance for Distinguished Contribution”, 43 teachers with title such as “Leading Scholars and Candidates of Sichuan Province”, “Teaching Masters of Sichuan Province”, “Model Teachers of Sichuan Province”. SUSE has hired about 100 adjunct professors and guest professors, including 4 academicians of the Chinese Academy of Sciences and Chinese Academy of Engineering, 6 Cheung Kong Scholars and winners of National Outstanding Youth Science Fund. SUSE receives students from over 23 provinces (municipalities) all across China. There are about 29,000 undergraduate students and 600 postgraduates.

Outreach
SUSE is fully committed to serving the development of local economic and social projects, having signed full-scale cooperation framework agreements and enterprise-university-research cooperation agreements with 13 local governments and over 100 famous enterprises (including Luzhou Laojiao, Chenguang Chemical Research Institute), undertaking more than 2200 scientific programs.

Mission
SUSE will bear in mind the mission of the university, including lay the foundation for the success of students and provide support for the local development through the transmission, innovation and application of scholarship; will stick to the basic idea, including educating people oriented, undertaking social responsibility and academic freedom; will rich the connotation of running model, including culture, idea, system and practice; will fully implement the internal management strategy, talents developing strategy, international cooperation strategy, university-local cooperation strategy and university-university cooperation strategy. SUSE will strive for the aim of building an application-oriented, multi-disciplinary university with characteristics and strength.

Universities and colleges in Sichuan